Rice Lake is a lake in Wadena County, in the U.S. state of Minnesota.

Rice Lake was so named on account of the wild rice which grows naturally within this lake.

See also
List of lakes in Minnesota

References

Lakes of Minnesota
Lakes of Wadena County, Minnesota